Gyeongju Tower is an observation tower located in the Gyeongju Expo Park, Gyeongju city, North Gyeongsang province, South Korea. It was completed on 14, August 2007 along with Gyeongju Expo Culture Center. The tower is with a height of 82 meters as comparable to that of a 30 storied apartment.

See also
N Seoul Tower
63 Building

References

Tourist attractions in Gyeongju
Buildings and structures in Gyeongju